Raidighi College, established in 1995, is an undergraduate college in Raidighi, West Bengal, India. It is affiliated with the University of Calcutta.

Departments

Science
Chemistry
Physics
Mathematics
Botany
Zoology
Food & Nutrition
Microbiology

Arts

Bengali
English
History
Geography
Political Science
Philosophy
Education
Sanskrit

Accreditation
Raidighi College is recognized by the University Grants Commission (UGC).

See also 
List of colleges affiliated to the University of Calcutta
Education in India
Education in West Bengal

References

External links
Raidighi College

Educational institutions established in 1995
University of Calcutta affiliates
Universities and colleges in South 24 Parganas district
1995 establishments in West Bengal